Shams al-Ma'arif or Shams al-Ma'arif wa Lata'if al-'Awarif is a 13th-century grimoire on Arabic magic and a manual for achieving esoteric spirituality. It was written by the scholar Ahmad al-Buni who wrote it while living in Ayyubid Egypt, he died around 1225 CE (622 AH). The Shams al-Ma'arif is generally regarded as the most influential textbook of its type in the Arab world, and is arguably as important as, if not more than, the Picatrix in both hemispheres.

In contemporary form the book consists of two volumes; Shams al-Ma'arif al-Kubra and Shams al-Ma'arif al-Sughra, the former being the larger of the two. The first few chapters introduce the reader to magic squares, and the combination of numbers and the alphabet that are believed to bring magical effect, which the author insists is the only way to communicate with jinn, angels and spirits. The table of contents that were introduced in the later printed editions of the work contain a list of unnumbered chapters (faṣl), which stretch to a number of 40. However, prior to the printing press and various other standardisations, there were three independent volumes that circulated, each one differing in length.

While being popular, it also carries a reputation for being suppressed and banned for much of Islamic history, but still flourishes in being read and studied up to the present day. Some Sufi orders, such as the Naqshbandi-Haqqani order have recognised its legitimacy and use as a compendium for the occult, and hold it in high regard.

Another title by the same author, namely Manba' Usool al-Hikmah ("The Source of the Essentials of Wisdom"), is considered its companion text.

Translations

Although full-volume translations into English are not known, there have been numerous renditions of a few of the more popular rituals found within the main treatise, as well as those that lie in its accompanying text. Some of these rituals have had various degrees of notability, but one of recurring presence in many publications is that of the Birhatiya (also known as The Ancient Oath or Red Sulphur).

In 2022 a partial English translation by Amina Inloes was published by Revelore Press as "Shams al-Ma’arif: The Sun of Knowledge An Arabic Grimoire: A selected Translation"

Outside of the Arab and Western world, several editions of the book have been published in the Urdu and Turkish languages.

See also
Alchemy in the medieval Islamic world
Astrology in the medieval Islamic world
Simiyya

Notes

External links
 Shams al-Ma'arif al-Kubra wa Lataifu al-Avarif 
 Partial Translation in Spanish and First Comparative Edition by Jaime Coullaut Cordero (from Universidad de Salamanca)

Medieval Arabic literature
Arabian mythology
Arabic grimoires
Islamic mythology
13th-century Islam
13th-century Arabic books